Kai Iwi is a rural community west of Whanganui in New Zealand's North Island. It lies close to SH 3, approximately halfway between Whanganui and Waitotara. The population centre is at Kai Iwi Beach, also called Mowhanau.

The area was settled by Europeans in the 1880s.

Other than farming, the community's largest industry is its honey factory, which was founded in 2003.

Demographics

The population of Kai Iwi was 141 in the 2018 New Zealand census, an increase of 6 (4.4%) since the 2013 census, and a decrease of 27 (-16.1%) since the 2006 census. There were 78 males and 63 females, giving a sex ratio of 1.24 males per female. Ethnicities were 135 people  (95.7%) European/Pākehā, and 21 (14.9%) Māori (totals add to more than 100% since people could identify with multiple ethnicities). Of the total population, 24 people  (17.0%) were under 15 years old, 21 (14.9%) were 15–29, 68 (48.2%) were 30–64, and 27 (19.1%) were over 65.

Mowhanau statistical area

The Mowhanau statistical area, which also covers Maxwell, had a population of 1,293 at the 2018 New Zealand census, a decrease of 9 people (-0.7%) since the 2013 census, and an increase of 135 people (11.7%) since the 2006 census. There were 492 households. There were 663 males and 627 females, giving a sex ratio of 1.06 males per female. The median age was 44.9 years (compared with 37.4 years nationally), with 273 people (21.1%) aged under 15 years, 174 (13.5%) aged 15 to 29, 648 (50.1%) aged 30 to 64, and 198 (15.3%) aged 65 or older.

Ethnicities were 92.1% European/Pākehā, 14.2% Māori, 0.9% Pacific peoples, 2.1% Asian, and 1.9% other ethnicities (totals add to more than 100% since people could identify with multiple ethnicities).

The proportion of people born overseas was 12.1%, compared with 27.1% nationally.

Although some people objected to giving their religion, 53.6% had no religion, 38.7% were Christian, 0.2% were Hindu, 0.2% were Muslim, 0.2% were Buddhist and 1.4% had other religions.

Of those at least 15 years old, 189 (18.5%) people had a bachelor or higher degree, and 177 (17.4%) people had no formal qualifications. The median income was $34,800, compared with $31,800 nationally. The employment status of those at least 15 was that 570 (55.9%) people were employed full-time, 198 (19.4%) were part-time, and 18 (1.8%) were unemployed.

Marae

Kai Iwi has three marae, affiliated with Ngāti Iti and the Ngā Rauru hapū of Ngāti Pūkeko: Te Aroha Marae and Te Kotahitanga meeting house; Kai Iwi Marae and Awhakaueroa meeting house; and Taipake Marae and Taipake meeting house.

In October 2020, the Government committed $522,926 from the Provincial Growth Fund to upgrade Te Ihupuku Marae, Waipapa Marae and Te Aroha Marae, creating 92 jobs.

Education

References

Whanganui District
Populated places in Manawatū-Whanganui